Chanos may refer to:

 Chanos (fish), a genus of milkfish
 Chanos-Curson, a commune of the Drôme, a department in southeastern France
 Chanos, Zamora, a municipality in Spain
 George Chanos (born 1958), American attorney and politician
 James Chanos (born 1957), American investor

See also
 Chano (disambiguation)